KUKI (1400 AM) is a radio station broadcasting a classic hits music format. Licensed to serve Ukiah, California, United States, the station serves the Fort Bragg-Ukiah area. The station is currently owned by Bicoastal Media Licenses, LLC.

Previous logos

References

External links

UKI (AM)
Classic hits radio stations in the United States